The South Main line connects Frankfurt am Main Hauptbahnhof with Hanau Hauptbahnhof. It consists of a two-track main line that runs via Offenbach Hauptbahnhof and a line of the Rhine-Main S-Bahn that is entirely independent of the main line tracks but is mainly built next to them. The S-Bahn line connects the Frankfurt City Tunnel to Offenbach Ost and Hanau. It is used by S-Bahn lines S8 and S9.

The original line was completed in 1873 and 1875, as part of the extension of the Frankfurt-Bebra Railway from Hanau to Frankfurt. The S-Bahn line was opened in 1992 and 1995.

Route

The main line consists of a two-track main line that leaves Frankfurt Hauptbahnhof, running next to the Main-Neckar Railway across the Main-Neckar Bridge over the Main. Shortly after crossing the bridge, it swings to the east away from the Main-Neckar line to Frankfurt South station and Offenbach Hauptbahnhof. It continues east to Steinheim Main Bridge, where it crosses the Main again to connect with the Frankfurt-Hanau Railway and runs into Hanau Hauptbahnhof.

The S-Bahn line branches off the City Tunnel between Ostendstraße and Frankfurt South stations and runs underground until it surfaces near the former Frankfurt-Oberrad station. It then uses part of the route of the Frankfurt-Offenbach Local Railway, which was closed in 1955, to a tunnel under Offenbach, which surfaces on the south side of the Frankfurt–Bebra line at Offenbach Ost station. It then runs to Hanau station above ground on the south side of the Main until just before Hanau, where it crosses the river. Most of the line has two tracks, but between Offenbach Ost and Mühlheim stations and between Mühlheim-Dietenheim and Hanau main stations it has a single track. Between Offenbach Ost and Hanau, it runs largely parallel with the Frankfurt–Bebra main line, but there is no rail connection between them.

History

The first section of the Frankfurt–Bebra railway was built as part of the Bebra–Hanau Railway or Kurhessen State Railway, which was initiated by the Electorate of Hesse-Kassel (Kurhessen) in 1863, but was completed from Bebra to Hanau in 1868 by Prussia after its annexation of Hesse-Kassel as a result of the Austro-Prussian War in 1866. Here it connected with the lines built and operated by the Frankfurt-Hanau Railway Company (Frankfurt-Hanauer Eisenbahn Gesellschaft), the line from Frankfurt Ost to Hanau (called the Hanauer Bahn, Hanau Railway) and the line from Hanau to Kahl (called the Maintalbahn, Main Valley Railway).

In 1864, the former Free City of Frankfurt had prevented an extension of the Bebra Railway and refused permission for it to run over the Hanau Railway to Frankfurt. As a result of Prussia's annexation of Frankfurt, the trains of the Bebra Railway were able to run over the Hanau Railway to Hanauer Bahnhof (Hanau station) in Frankfurt. Because this was in the east of Frankfurt, and therefore far away from the Frankfurt western stations and the railways terminating there, trains from 1869 ran on the Frankfurt City Link Line (Verbindungsbahn) on the northern bank of the Main to the Main-Weser station.

The northern route had several disadvantages, however: it was an indirect route, it skirted the town of Offenbach am Main and, not least, the line had limited capacity. There were already plans in 1868 for a bridge over the Main south of the former Hanau station in Hanau and a south Main line that would connect in Offenbach with the Frankfurt-Offenbach Local Railway. The planned route ran through the Grand Duchy of Hesse (Hesse-Darmstadt), although this was the only one of the Hessian states that still existed after the Peace of Prague, although it had also been on the losing side in the 1866 war.

The tracks of the Local Railway were not designed to handle long-distance rail traffic. Therefore, a new long-distance line was built on an embankment and the inner cities of Offenbach and Sachsenhausen were bypassed to their south. In Hanau, southeast of the former Hanau station (now called Hanau West), a large new "island station" (Inselbahnhof)—then called Hanau Ost station, but now called Hanau Hauptbahnhof—was built west of the Steinheim Main Bridge. The opening of the new line was delayed until the completion of the Main bridge on 15 November 1873, when was the line was opened to the Bebraer Bahnhof (Bebra station, now Frankfurt South station).

Exactly one year later, on 15 November 1874, the Bebra-Hanau Railway was officially renamed the Frankfurt-Bebra Railway (Frankfurt-Bebraer Eisenbahn). It then took another year before the line was extended via the former Bahnhof Mainspitze (Main “spike” station) and a bridge at the location of the current Peace Bridge (now used by a road and a tram line) to the Frankfurt Main-Neckar station, which was opened on 1 December 1875.

The current Main-Neckar bridge was built from 1881 and was at first opened for freight only on 1 August 1885. Following the closure of West Frankfurt stations and the opening of today's Hauptbahnhof in Frankfurt on 18 August 1888, the old route via the Peace Bridge was abandoned and replaced by today's route running a kilometre further to the south-west.

The first section of the S-Bahn line from the City Tunnel was opened to Mühlberg in 1992. The Offenbach City Tunnel was opened in 1995 and the line was extended to Hanau.

Services

The line is served by several Intercity as well as Intercity-Express (ICE) lines, three Regional-Express services and a Stadt-Express line (operating as a Regionalbahn service), and (on some sections) four Rhine-Main S-Bahn lines.

Long-distance passenger traffic 
In long-distance passenger traffic the line is served by four ICE lines, each at two-hour intervals, running on the South Main line and the Kinzig Valley Railway." ICE lines 11 and 50 supplement each other to provide an approximately hourly service, with line 50 running six minutes later and stopping more often on the route to Leipzig. There is also the ICE Sprinter Line 15, which runs from Frankfurt via Erfurt and the Erfurt–Leipzig/Halle high-speed railway to Berlin. The three last-mentioned lines now run almost the entire route of the former Frankfurt–Bebra railway. Other IC or ICE services operate on the South Main line and the Main-Spessart railway.

Regional passenger services 
The following regional services operate on the line:

S-Bahn

The line is served by S-Bahn lines S8 and S9. These operate during peak hours at 15-minute intervals, while at other times the eastern section between Offenbach Ost and Hanau is served only every 30 minutes. Trains are usually operated by DB Class 420 electrical multiple units.

Freight 

The freight yard commissioned in 1873 in Offenbach was shut down in 1919. In 2005 It was put back into operation and has since been rebuilt.

Notes

External links
 

Railway lines in Hesse
Transport in Frankfurt
Rhine-Main S-Bahn
Standard gauge railways in Germany
Railway lines opened in 1873
1873 establishments in Germany
Buildings and structures in Offenbach am Main